Arnaud Dominique Nordin (born 17 June 1998) is a French professional footballer who plays as a forward for  club Montpellier.

Club career
Nordin is a youth exponent from Saint-Étienne. He made his Ligue 1 debut on 25 September 2016 against Lille.

On 13 June 2022, Nordin signed a pre-contract agreement to join Ligue 1 side Montpellier upon the expiration of his Saint-Étienne contract on 1 July 2022. He chose the number 7 shirt at the club.

Personal life
Nordin was born in metropolitan France and is of Martiniquais 
Malagasy
descent.

Career statistics

Honours 
Saint-Étienne

 Coupe de France runner-up: 2019–20

References

External links
 
France profile at FFF 
Saint-Étienne profile 

1998 births
Living people
Footballers from Paris
French footballers
French people of Martiniquais descent
France youth international footballers
Association football midfielders
Paris 13 Atletico players
US Créteil-Lusitanos players
AS Saint-Étienne players
AS Nancy Lorraine players
Montpellier HSC players
Championnat National 3 players
Championnat National 2 players
Ligue 1 players
Ligue 2 players
Olympic footballers of France
Footballers at the 2020 Summer Olympics
Black French sportspeople